FrancEyE aka Frances Dean Smith (March 19, 1922 – June 2, 2009), was an American poet.

Biography
Frances Dean Smith was born Frances Elizabeth Dean, in San Rafael, California, on March 19, 1922. During her childhood her family moved to the East Coast, where she grew up.

She married Wray Smith while living on the East Coast. They had four daughters but eventually divorced and Frances returned to California in 1963, leaving her children with her now ex-husband.

She was closely associated with the Southern California poetry community. She is also noted for her relationship with poet Charles Bukowski, with whom she had her fifth daughter and his only child, Marina Louise Bukowski. Charles Bukowski wrote a poem about Frances which has been used as a eulogy, "One for Old Snaggle-Tooth" (1977).

Throughout her long career as a writer she never sought to capitalize on her connection to Bukowski and was revered as “The Bearded Witch of Santa Monica.” She died from complications of a hip fracture in Marin General Hospital in Greenbrae, California, early on June 2, 2009.

Works
 Four Poets, (Ruth Wire, Grace Bogart, Joanne Stell, S.S.Veri), written under the pseudonym S.S. Veri
 Snaggletooth in Ocean Park, poems, 1996 (The Sacred Beverage Press)
 Amber Spider, poems, 2004 (Pearl Press)
 Grandma Stories, short stories (with drawings by Tim Donnelly), 2008
 Call, poems, 2009 (Rose of Sharon Press)

Film appearances
 Bukowski: Born Into This (2003) Documentary on Charles Bukowski.
 Graffiti Verité 6: "The Odyssey: Poets Passion & Poetry" (2006)

References

External links
 Review of Baby Grandma in the Santa Monica Mirror
 Brief Bio on Poetry Superhighway
 Interviewed re: Bukowski in an LA Times article on Poets
  FrancEyE Frances Dean Smith 1922-2009
 francEyE - poems

1922 births
2009 deaths
American women poets
Writers from San Rafael, California
20th-century American poets
20th-century American women writers
People from Greenbrae, California
21st-century American women